Humic substances (HS) are organic compounds that are important components of humus, the major organic fraction of soil, peat, and coal (and also a constituent of many upland streams, dystrophic lakes, and ocean water). For a long era in the 19th and 20th centuries, humic substances were often viewed through a lens of acid–base theory that described humic acids (HA), as organic acids, and their conjugate bases, humates, as important components of organic matter. Through this viewpoint humic acids were defined as organic substances extracted from soil that coagulate (form small solid pieces) when a strong-base extract is acidified, whereas fulvic acids (FA) are organic acids that remain soluble (stay dissolved) when a strong-base extract is acidified. The remaining alkali-insoluble part of humus would be termed humin.

Humic matter in isolation is the result of a chemical extraction from the soil organic matter or the dissolved organic matter and represent the humic molecules distributed in the soil or water. A new understanding views humic substances not as high-molecular-weight macropolymers but as heterogeneous and relatively small molecular components of the soil organic matter auto-assembled in supramolecular associations and composed of a variety of compounds of biological origin and synthesized by abiotic and biotic reactions in soil. It is the large molecular complexity of the soil humeome that confers to humic matter its bioactivity in soil and its role as plant growth promoter.

The academic definition of humic substances is under debate as "humification" becomes unsupported as a special case, leading to some radical definitions expanding HS to encompass all difficult-to-characterize soil organic matter, at the cost of clarity. There is also a call to forgo the traditional alkali extract method and directly analyze the soil, but its complexity prevents widespread adoption in agriculture. In practice, this means some sources may apply a traditional acid-base analysis to compost, then state the results in term of "humic substances".

Traditional view of formation and description
The formation of humic substances in nature is one of the least understood aspects of humus chemistry and one of the most intriguing. There are three main theories to explain it: the lignin theory of Waksman (1932), the polyphenol theory, and the sugar-amine condensation theory of Maillard (1911). Those theories are insufficient to account for observations in soil research. 
Humic substances are formed by the microbial degradation of dead plant matter, such as lignin and charcoal. Humic substances in the lab are very resistant to further biodegradation. The precise properties and structure of a given sample depend on the water or soil source and the specific conditions of extraction. Nevertheless, the average properties of lab produced humic substances from different sources are remarkably similar.

Fractionation 
Humic substances in soils and sediments can be divided into three main fractions: humic acids, fulvic acids, and humin. Their presence and relative abundance is inferred by lab extraction, a process which alters their original form beyond recognition.
 The humic and fulvic acids are extracted as a colloidal sol from soil and other solid phase sources into a strongly basic aqueous solution of sodium hydroxide or potassium hydroxide.
 Humic acids are precipitated from this solution by adjusting the pH to 1 with hydrochloric acid.
 The alcohol-soluble portion of the humic fraction is, in general, named ulmic acid.
 So-called "gray humic acids" (GHA) are soluble in low-ionic-strength alkaline media.
 "Brown humic acids" (BHA) are soluble in alkaline conditions independent of ionic strength.
 The fulvic acids is left in solution at pH 1. They remain soluble independent of pH and ionic strength.
 Humin are insoluble in dilute alkali.

Humic acid as traditionally produced in a laboratory is not a single acid; rather, it is a complex mixture of many different acids containing carboxyl and phenolate groups so that the mixture behaves functionally as a dibasic acid or, occasionally, as a tribasic acid. Humic acid used to amend soil is manufactured using these same well established procedures. Humic acids can form complexes with ions that are commonly found in the environment creating humic colloids.

As a nutrition supplement, fulvic acid can be found in a liquid form as a component of mineral colloids. Fulvic acids are poly-electrolytes and are unique colloids that diffuse easily through membranes, whereas all other colloids do not.

A sequential chemical fractionation called Humeomics can be used to isolate more homogeneous humic fractions and determine their molecular structures by advanced spectroscopic and chromatographic methods. Substances identified in humic extracts and directly in soil include mono-, di-, and tri-hydroxycarboxylic acids, fatty acids, dicarboxylic acids, linear alcohols, phenolic acids, terpenoids, carbohydrates, and amino acids.

Criticism

Decomposition products of dead plant materials form intimate associations with minerals, making it difficult to isolate and characterize soil organic constituents. 18th century soil chemists successfully used alkaline extraction to isolate a portion of the organic constituents in soil. This led to the theory that a 'humification' process created 'humic substances'; most commonly 'humic acid', 'fulvic acid', and 'humin'. However, these humic substances have not been observed in soil.   Although 'humification' theory is unsupported by evidence, "the underlying theory persists in the contemporary literature, including current textbooks." Attempts to redefine 'humic substances' in valid terms have resulted in a proliferation of incompatible definitions, "with far-reaching implications beyond our ability to communicate scientifically accurate soil processes and properties."

Chemical characteristics

In nature 
Since the dawn of modern chemistry, humic substances are among the most studied among the natural materials. Despite long study, their molecular structure and chemical remains elusive. The traditional view is that humic substances are heteropolycondensates, in varying associations with clay. A more recent view is that relatively small molecules also play a role. Humic substances account for 50 – 90% of cation exchange capacity. Similar to clay, char and colloidal humus hold cation nutrients.

In traditional, base-soluble extracts 

A typical humic substance is a mixture of many molecules, some of which are based on a motif of aromatic nuclei with phenolic and carboxylic substituents, linked together; the illustration shows a typical structure.
The functional groups that contribute most to surface charge and reactivity of humic substances are phenolic and carboxylic groups. Humic acids behave as mixtures of dibasic acids, with a pK1 value around 4 for protonation of carboxyl groups and around 8 for protonation of phenolate groups. There is considerable overall similarity among individual humic acids. For this reason, measured pK values for a given sample are average values relating to the constituent species. The other important characteristic is charge density. The molecules may form a supramolecular structure held together by non-covalent forces, such as van der Waals force, π-π, and CH-π bonds.

The presence of carboxylate and phenolate groups gives the humic acids the ability to form complexes with ions such as Mg2+, Ca2+, Fe2+, and Fe3+. Many humic acids have two or more of these groups arranged so as to enable the formation of chelate complexes. The formation of (chelate) complexes is an important aspect of the biological role of humic acids in regulating bioavailability of metal ions.

Determination of humic acids in water samples
The presence of humic acid in water intended for potable or industrial use can have a significant impact on the treatability of that water and the success of chemical disinfection processes. For instance, humic and fulvic acids can react with the chemicals used in the chlorination process to form disinfection byproducts such as dihaloacetonitriles, which are toxic to humans. Accurate methods of establishing humic acid concentrations are therefore essential in maintaining water supplies, especially from upland peaty catchments in temperate climates.

As a lot of different bio-organic molecules in very diverse physical associations are mixed together in natural environments, it is cumbersome to measure their exact concentrations in the humic superstructure. For this reason, concentrations of humic acid are traditionally estimated out of concentrations of organic matter, typically from concentrations of total organic carbon (TOC) or dissolved organic carbon (DOC).

Extraction procedures are bound to alter some of the chemical linkages present in the soil humic substances (mainly ester bonds in biopolyesters such as cutins and suberins). The humic extracts are composed of large numbers of different bio-organic molecules that have not yet been totally separated and identified. However, single classes of residual biomolecules have been identified by selective extractions and chemical fractionation, and are represented by alkanoic and hydroxy alkanoic acids, resins, waxes, lignin residues, sugars, and peptides.

Ecological effects
Organic matter soil amendments have been known by farmers to be beneficial to plant growth for longer than recorded history. However, the chemistry and function of the organic matter have been a subject of controversy since humans began postulating about it in the 18th century. Until the time of Liebig, it was supposed that humus was used directly by plants, but, after Liebig showed that plant growth depends upon inorganic compounds, many soil scientists held the view that organic matter was useful for fertility only as it was broken down with the release of its constituent nutrient elements into inorganic forms.
At the present time, soil scientists hold a more holistic view and at least recognize that humus influences soil fertility through its effect on the water-holding capacity of the soil. Also, since plants have been shown to absorb and translocate the complex organic molecules of systemic insecticides, they can no longer discredit the idea that plants may be able to absorb the soluble forms of humus; this may in fact be an essential process for the uptake of otherwise insoluble iron oxides.

A study on the effects of humic acid on plant growth was conducted at Ohio State University which said in part "humic acids increased plant growth" and that there were "relatively large responses at low application rates".

A 1998 study by scientists at the North Carolina State University College of Agriculture and Life Sciences showed that addition of humate to soil significantly increased root mass in creeping bentgrass turf.

A 2018 study by scientists at the University of Alberta showed that humic acids can reduce prion infectivity in laboratory experiments, but that this effect may be uncertain in the environment due to minerals in the soil that buffer the effect.

Anthropogenic production 
Humans can affect the production of humic substances via a variety of ways: by making use of natural processes by composting lignin or adding biochar (see soil rehabilitation), or by industrial synthesis of artificial humic substances from organic feedstocks directly. These artificial substances may be similarly divided into artificial humic acid (A-HA) and artificial fulvic acid (A-FA).

Lignosulfonate from sulfite pulping can be made to mimic humus by hydrolysis and oxidation. The product is already commercialized as "lignohumate".

Agricultural litter can be turned into an artificial humic substance by a hydrothermal reaction. The resulting mixture can increase the content of dissolved organic matter and total organic carbon in soil.

Lignite (brown coal) may also be oxidized to produce humic substances, reversing the process of coal formation. This form of "mineral-derived fulvic acid" is widely used in China. This process also occurs in nature, producing leonardite.

Economic geology
In economic geology, the term humate refers to geological materials, such as weathered coal beds (leonardite), mudrock, or pore material in sandstones, that are rich in humic acids. Humate has been mined from the Fruitland Formation of New Mexico for use as a soil amendment since the 1970s, with nearly 60,000 metric tons produced by 2016. Humate deposits may also play an important role in the genesis of uranium ore bodies.

Technological applications
The heavy-metal binding abilities of humic acids have been exploited to develop remediation technologies for removing heavy metals from waste water. To this end, Yurishcheva et al. coated magnetic nanoparticles with humic acids. After capturing lead ions, the nanoparticles can then be captured using a magnet.

Ancient masonry
Archeology finds that ancient Egypt used mudbricks reinforced with straw and humic acids.

See also
Humus
Soil
Humin
Polycyclic aromatic hydrocarbon

References

External links
 Supramolecular Humic Systems in the Environment (In English, original is Italian)

Further reading

Sillanpää, M. (Ed.) Natural Organic Matter in Water, Characterization and Treatment Methods 

Composting
Organic acids
Soil chemistry